Dhone Assembly constituency is a constituency of the Andhra Pradesh Legislative Assembly, India. It is one of 7 constituencies in the Nandyal district. Buggana Rajendranath of YSR Congress Party is currently representing the constituency.

Overview
It is part of the Nandyal Lok Sabha constituency along with another six Assembly constituency segments, namely, Allagadda, Srisailam, Nandikotkur, Panyam, Banaganapalle and Nandyal in Nandyal district.

Mandals

Members of Legislative Assembly

Election results

Assembly elections 1952

Assembly Elections 2004

Assembly Elections 2009

Assembly elections 2014
Aki

Assembly elections 2019
Aki

See also
 List of constituencies of Andhra Pradesh Legislative Assembly

References

Assembly constituencies of Andhra Pradesh